Vale do Anari is a municipality located in the Brazilian state of Rondônia. Its population was 11,377 (2020) and its area is 3,135 km².

History
The municipality was instated by law n°572 (22 June 1994), signed by governor Oswaldo Piana Filho, with its area taken from Machadinho d'Oeste municipality.

The municipality contains part of the  Jaru Biological Reserve, a fully protected conservation unit created in 1984.
It contains the  Seringueira Extractive Reserve, one of a number of small sustainable use units in the region whose primary product is rubber.
The municipality also contains the Aquariquara Extractive Reserve, also created in 1995.

References

Municipalities in Rondônia